NALC may refer to:

 National Association of Letter Carriers, a labor union of city letter carriers employed by the United States Postal Service
 National Association of Local Councils, a body which represents the interests of parish and town councils in England 
 North American Lutheran Church a Lutheran church synod formed in 2010